Belgium was represented by 18 athletes (10 male/8 female) and 1 reserve at the 2002 European Athletics Championships held in  Munich, Germany, from 6 August to 11 August 2002.

Medals

Participants

Men

Track and road events

Field events

Women

Track and road events

References 

Nations at the 2002 European Athletics Championships
2002
European Athletics Championships